Frank Magleby (March 22, 1928 – December 17, 2013) was an American painter and educator. He taught Art at Brigham Young University for 35 years, and he designed murals in the Nauvoo Illinois Temple.

Life
Magleby was born on March 22, 1928 in Idaho Falls, Idaho. His maternal uncle, Dean Fausett, was a painter. Magleby graduated from Brigham Young University, where he earned a bachelor's degree in 1950 and a master's degree in 1952. He attended the Art Students League of New York, and he received a doctor of education from Columbia University in 1969.

Magleby taught Art at Brigham Young University from 1959 to 1994. He was also a painter, and he did many landscape paintings for the Church of Jesus Christ of Latter-day Saints. In 2001, Magleby designed murals in the Nauvoo Illinois Temple alongside Gary Smith, Jim Christiansen, Doug Fryer, Chris Young, and Robert Marshall. Some of his artwork was acquired by the Springville Museum of Art.

Magleby was a member of LDS Church, and he married Mildred Elizabeth Boise in the Salt Lake Temple in 1956. They resided in Provo, Utah with their five children. Magleby died on December 17, 2013.

References

External links
 Frank Magleby interviewed by Glen Leonard - Episode 9 on The Church of Jesus Christ of Latter-day Saints website

1928 births
2013 deaths
People from Idaho Falls, Idaho
Brigham Young University alumni
Art Students League of New York alumni
Teachers College, Columbia University alumni
Brigham Young University faculty
American landscape painters
American male painters
American muralists
American Latter Day Saint artists
Artists from Idaho
Painters from Utah
20th-century American painters
21st-century American painters
Painters from Idaho